Anjali Bansal is the founder of Avaana Capital, investing in technology and innovation-led start-ups who are catalysing climate action and sustainability and delivering exponential returns. She has invested in various successful startups including Nykaa, Delhivery, UrbanClap, Darwinbox, Coverstack, Farmart, and Lenskart.

Previously, she was non-executive chairperson of Dena Bank, appointed by Govt of India to drive the resolution of the stressed bank leading to the first ever 3 way merger of three large public sector banks-Dena, Bank of Baroda, and Vijaya Bank. 
She was previously global partner and managing director with TPG Growth PE, Spencer Stuart India Founder CEO, and strategy consultant with McKinsey and Co. in New York and India. She started her career as an engineer. 
Anjali serves as an independent non-executive director on leading boards including Piramal Enterprises and Tata Power.  She has previously chaired the India board of Women's World Banking and was on the Advisory Board of the Columbia University Global Centers, and company boards of GSK Pharma, Siemens, and Delhivery.

She serves on the Advisory Council of Open Networks for Digital Commerce (ONDC) and has been appointed to the Experts Advisory Committee of Startup India Seed Fund Scheme announced by Honorable Prime Minister.  She is closely associated with NITI Aayog, Women Entrepreneurship Platform.

She has been elected as President Bombay Chamber of Commerce and Industry, and serves on the CII National Committee on Corporate Governance. As an active contributor to the dialogue on corporate governance and diversity, Anjali previously co-founded and chaired the FICCI Center for Corporate Governance program for Women on Corporate Boards. She is a charter member of TIE and a member of the Young Presidents Organization.

Anjali has a BE in Computer Engineering from Gujarat University, a Masters in International Finance and Business from Columbia University, and the YPO Presidents Program at Harvard Business School.
She has been listed as one of the "Most Powerful Women in Indian Business" by India's leading publication, Business Today, and as one of the "Most Powerful Women in Business by Fortune India

Education
She completed her graduation in Computer Engineering from Gujarat University. After a brief stint at Indian Space Research Organization (ISRO), following her tenure at ISRO, Anjali completed her post-graduation, with distinction, in International Affairs from Columbia University, where she majored in International Finance and Business.

Career
Anjali Bansal is the Founder of Avaana Capital, and serves as an independent non-executive director on the public boards of GlaxoSmithKline Pharmaceuticals India, Bata India Limited, Tata Power and Voltas - a Tata Enterprise.

She has been a global Partner and MD with TPG Private Equity and a strategy consultant with McKinsey & Company in New York and Mumbai. She founded and led Spencer Stuart's India practice successfully growing it to a highly reputed pan-India platform. She was also a global partner and co-led their Asia Pacific Board & CEO practice as part of the Asia Pacific leadership team.

In addition, she is a member of industry forums such as the Bombay Chamber of Commerce & Industry & Confederation of Indian Industry. She is also on the Board of the non-profit organization, United Way of Mumbai. She is also on the Advisory Board of the Columbia University Global Centers, South Asia. Anjali has been invited to and is a part of the Asian Business Leaders Advisory Council (ABLAC). Previously, she chaired the board of FWWB (Friends of Women's World Banking). In addition, Anjali is a charter member of The Indus Entrepreneurs (TiE) and is a mentor to the IIT Mumbai-TiE Society for Innovation and Entrepreneurship (SINE) incubator. She also serves as a trustee on the board of the United Way of Mumbai and Enactus. Anjali is a Super Mentor and Brand Ambassador for Niti Aayog's Mentor India initiative to empower young innovators in schools.

Anjali is a frequent commentator on board governance, diversity and entrepreneurship. She has had several speaking opportunities including Digital Women Awards and Keynote at LinkedIn Connect Conference and has been a jury for The Economic Times 40 Under 40, Women Ahead and CEO Awards. Anjali is the Founder and Chair of Women on Corporate Boards (WCB) and is on the Managing Committee of Bombay Chamber and an active member of the YPO. She joins the jury of VCCircle Awards 2016. Anjali is also part of the faculty for ISB, Hyderabad's programme on 'Governance and Effectiveness' that addresses current and future board members. She was part of the jury for Digital Women Awards 2016 and is a mentor with CII Startup Mentorship Circle. Anjali was the host for Fortune India The Most Powerful Women 2017 Event in Mumbai in January 2017.

She is also the Co-founder and chair of the Federation of Indian Chambers of Commerce & Industry Center for Corporate Governance program for Women on Corporate Boards, on the Managing committee of the Bombay Chamber of Commerce and Industry (BCCI), and part of the CII National Committee for Women. Anjali addressed the 12th CII Corporate Governance Summit held on 11 November 2017, in Mumbai.

Anjali started her career as an engineer.

Appointed as chief managing director at Dena Bank, a public sector unit, on 23 May 2018

Personal life
Anjali met her husband, Sandeep Singhal, during her tenure with McKinsey & Company in New York. Sandeep is today the co-founder of venture capital fund Nexus Venture Partners. The couple live in Mumbai.

Recognitions
Anjali has been named as one of the most powerful women in business in India by Business Today in 2013, Fortune India Magazine in 2012, India Today in 2011.

References 

Living people
Gujarat University alumni
School of International and Public Affairs, Columbia University alumni
Indian chief executives
Businesspeople from Mumbai
Women scientists from Maharashtra
Indian women chief executives
Businesswomen from Maharashtra
Year of birth missing (living people)
20th-century Indian women
20th-century Indian people